China Liv Pro Cycling is a professional women's road bicycle racing team based in Hong Kong.

Team roster

Major results

2006
1st Tour de Gastown, Gina Grain
1st Asian Cycling Championships (Time Trial), Wang Li
1st Asian Games (Time Trial), Li Meifang
2007
1st Tour of Chongming Time Trial, Liu Yongli
1st Overall Tour of Chongming Island, Li Meifang
1st Stage 4, Li Meifang
1st Boucle des Championnes - Royat, Wang Fei
1st Asian Cycling Championships (Time Trial), Li Meifang
1st Asian Cycling Championships (Road Race), Meng Lang
2008
1st UCI World Cup Chongming (Points race), Jamie Wong
1st Asian Cycling Championships (Time Trial), Li Meifang
1st Asian Cycling Championships (Road Race), Min Gao
1st Tour of Chongming Time Trial, Li Meifang
1st Overall Tour of Chongming Island, Li Meifang
1st Stage 1, Yun Mei Wu
1st Stage 2, Li Meifang
2010
1st Asian Games Track Championships (Points race), Liu Xin
2011
1st Asia Cup Individual Pursuit, Jamie Wong
2012
1st Overall Tour of Thailand, Liu Xin
1st Stage 2, Liu Xin
1st Tour of Zhoushan Island II, Liu Xiaohui
2013
1st Track Asia Cup (Individual Pursuit) Jamie Wong
1st Track Asia Cup (Team Pursuit), Jamie Wong
1st Track Asia Cup (Points race), Jamie Wong
East Asian Track Games (Individual Pursuit), Huang Dongyan
2014
1st Track Asia Cup (3 km Pursuit), Jamie Wong
1st Track Asia Cup (Omnium), Luo Xiaoling
1st Track Asia Cup (Points race), Jamie Wong
2015
1st Overall The Princess Maha Chackri Sirindhon's Cup, Meng Zhaojuan
1st Stage 3, Meng Zhaojuan
1st Beijing Omnium, Tian Yuanyuan
2017
1st Asian Cycling Championships (Team Pursuit), Huang Dongyan
1st Asian Cycling Championships (Team Pursuit), Luo Xiaoling
1st Asian Cycling Championships, Individual Time Trial, Liang Hongyu

National and continental champions

2007
 China Time Trial, Meifang Li
 China Road Race, Na Zhao
2011
 Hong Kong Road Race, Wan Yiu Jamie Wong
2012
 Asian Track (Points race), Wan Yiu Jamie Wong
 Hong Kong Road Race, Wan Yiu Jamie Wong
2013
 Asian Track (Points race), Wan Yiu Jamie Wong
 Hong Kong Track (Individual Pursuit), Wan Yiu Jamie Wong
 Hong Kong Track (Team Pursuit), Wan Yiu Jamie Wong
 Hong Kong Road Race, Wan Yiu Jamie Wong
 Hong Kong Time Trial, Wan Yiu Jamie Wong
2014
 Asian Track (Team Pursuit), Dong Yan Huang
 Asian Track (Scratch), Dong Yan Huang
 Hong Kong Time Trial, Wan Yiu Jamie Wong
2015
 Hong Kong Road Race, Zhao Juan Meng
 Hong Kong Track (Scratch), Zhao Juan Meng
 Hong Kong Track (Individual sprint), Zhao Juan Meng
 Hong Kong Track (Keirin), Zhao Juan Meng
 Hong Kong Track (Team sprint), Zhao Juan Meng
 China Track (Omnium), Yuanyuan Tian
 China Track (Team pursuit), Wan Tong Wang
 China Track (Team pursuit), Dong Yan Huang
2016
 Hong Kong Road Race, Zhao Juan Meng
2018
 China Track (Madison), Jiali Liu

Previous squads

2016

2015

As of 10 March 2015. Ages as of 1 January 2015.

2014

2013

2012

2011

References

External links

UCI Women's Teams
Cycling teams based in Hong Kong
Cycling teams established in 2006